Sports in Malta include association football, basketball, athletics, rugby, tennis, cycling, and others.

Football

Association football (soccer is the most popular sport in Malta. The national stadium is called Ta' Qali Stadium. The national football team has won several matches over big opponents that reached the final phases in World Cups, such as Belgium and Hungary. Recently a large number of football grounds have been built throughout the island. The top football league in Malta is called the Maltese Premier League, and consists of 14 teams. Futsal is also very popular.

Watersports
Malta is a good place for surfing and offers a lot of different surf spots. During winter time most of the beaches transform into surfer hangouts.

Waterpolo

Water polo is also very popular in Malta. The Malta men's national water polo team has achieved some great results against strong teams, and has competed in the Olympics twice. Maltese clubs participate in the European Club competitions organised by LEN, are seen as being in the top 10 water polo leagues in Europe.

Boċċi
Boċċi is the Maltese version of the Italian game of bocce, French pétanque and British bowls. Other than certain differences in rules and the ground on which the game is played, one of the most obvious differences between Maltese boċċi and foreign equivalents is the shape of the bowls themselves which tend to be cylindrical rather than spherical in shape. Many small clubs (usually called Klabbs tal-Boċċi in Maltese) can be found in Maltese and Gozitan localities, and are usually well-frequented and are quite active on a local and European level. Even the emigrants to Canada, Australia, and The United States have taken the game with them and now forms an important part of their social scene.

Hockey

Maltese National Hockey League is the official field hockey league in Malta, with 4 teams participating in the National League. The current champions are Sliema Hotsticks Hockey Club.

The National Hockey Stadium is located in Paola, Kordin.

The Malta National Hockey Team participates in several international fixtures each year.

Rugby
Rugby league is played, primarily due to return migration of Maltese Australians bringing it back with them. In July 2022, the national men's team was ranked 10th in the world. The national team are known as the Malta Knights, and boast players currently playing in the Super League in England such as Jarrod Sammut, Jake Mamo, the most famous player to come from Malta would be former South Sydney Rabbitohs, Mario Fenech. In 2016 Malta Rugby League had 285 players, with the large majority based in Australia.

Rugby union is also played in Malta, In October 2021 the national men's team was ranked 41st in the world. They have recently been achieving success, defeating teams including Sweden, Croatia and Latvia. In 2018, Malta achieved its largest win against Andorra, that of 89-3. As of 2016 Malta Rugby Union had 2,480 registered players.

Motorsport
Motorsport includes drag racing represented by the Malta Drag Racing Association, with recent high ranking Maltese dragsters in official FIA European championships. There is also autocross (ASMK), hill climb (Island Car Club), motocross, karting and banger racing championships.

Basketball

In 2020, Malta got its first-ever female head coach leading a men’s Division One basketball team. It was Silvia Gambino who started the position at Mellieħa S.C. Libertas.

Volleyball
Malta has a first division for women's volleyball teams. The president of the national federation MVA has been Jesmond Saliba.

Snooker
Malta also hosts a snooker round, the Malta Cup, which  became a non-ranking event. In 2008 Malta's Tony Drago was a member of a victorious European Mosconi Cup team, which was played in Portomaso, Malta. Claudio Cassar was World Blackball Champion in 2014.

Boxing
Boxer Jeff Fenech is of Maltese descent. Recently contact sports such as Boxing and Kickboxing have become increasingly popular.

Cricket
Malta are an affiliate member of the ICC & has full Twenty20 International status. Home games are played at Marsa. In 2020 there was a T20 summer domestic league consisting of 12 teams, and in 2019 a 50-over winter league which comprised 5 teams.

Along with other sports, tennis is a popular activity in Malta and Gozo. The islands offer a wide range of options for both beginners and elite players. Clubs are spread out across Malta and games are being played on a regular basis all year around.

There ,are over 1,200 rock climbing routes in Malta. The island offers a mixture of both trad climbing and sport climbing and also offers a good variety of bouldering and deep water soloing. The geography and small size of the island makes the climbing easily accessible. The sport is growing in popularity with local communities, as well as tourists and visitors.

List of sports teams in Malta

See also
Malta Olympic Committee
Maltese National Regatta
Maltese National Badminton Championships
Malta Sailing Federation
Handball Malta and Malta Handball Association
Aquatic Sports Association of Malta

References